Raymond Durand (born 8 July 1952 in Gap, Hautes-Alpes) is a French rally driver. He won the FIA Alternative Energies Cup drivers' title with Toyota in 2009 (finishing first in the Rally of Montecarlo and in the Ecorally San Marino – Città del Vaticano) and in 2010 (when he won in Zolder and Reykjavík).

References

See also
FIA Alternative Energies Cup
Massimo Liverani
Guido Guerrini (traveler)

FIA E-Rally Regularity Cup drivers
Living people
French rally drivers
1952 births